Lord of the Rings: Game One (released in North America as The Fellowship of the Ring: A Software Adventure) is a video game released in 1985 and based on the book The Fellowship of the Ring, by J. R. R. Tolkien. It was the follow-up to the 1982 game The Hobbit, but did not reach the same level of critical success as its predecessor. It's generally considered inferior by the gaming community, with many complaining about the removal of the real-time aspects and complex AI patterns of the previous game, and puzzles that lacked coherent solutions. To promote the game, Melbourne House commissioned hologram picture of a Nazgûl from a company called Holographix. It was available to purchase from Melbourne House directly using an order form on the instruction booklet included with the game. A sequel, Shadows of Mordor: Game Two of Lord of the Rings, was released in 1987.

Reception
Macworld reviewed the Macintosh versions of The Hobbit, The Fellowship of the Ring and The Shadows of Mordor simultaneously, criticizing The Hobbit, calling it "particularly clumsy" as it is "handicapped by a 400-word input vocabulary" as opposed to the latter two games' 800 words. Macworld calls The Fellowship of the Ring "particularly intricate" and recommends it as an entry point to the series as opposed to The Hobbit. Macworld praises The Hobbit's graphics, but states that in The Fellowship of the Ring and The Shadows of Mordor the art adds little to the games' overall appeal. Furthermore, Macworld heralds the three games as "literate and faithful in spirit to original books", but criticizes the dated and "rigid" nature of the text-adventure format.

According to Beam Software, the game was a commercial success.

References

External links
 
 
 
 http://www.lysator.liu.se/tolkien-games/entry/lotr-gameone.html

1980s interactive fiction
1985 video games
Adventure games
Amstrad CPC games
Amstrad PCW games
Apple II games
BBC Micro and Acorn Electron games
Classic Mac OS games
Commodore 64 games
DOS games
Interactive fiction based on works
Single-player video games
Game One
Video games developed in Australia
ZX Spectrum games